Tamar Simon Hoffs (née Tamar Ruth Simon; October 23, 1934) is an American filmmaker, best known for directing the indie films Red Roses and Petrol (2003) and Pound of Flesh (2009), both starring Malcolm McDowell.

Life and career
Hoffs was born in Johnstown, Pennsylvania, to a Jewish family. Her parents were Kelsey H. and Rabbi Ralph Simon. She grew up in Chicago and received a BA from the University of Chicago, followed by Graduate Studies at Yale University School of Fine Arts and the Illinois Institute of Technology, Institute of Design.

After moving to Los Angeles, Hoffs entered the filmmaking profession almost by accident, when actor friend Leonard Nimoy asked her to join the art department of his indie film, Deathwatch. In 1974, she co-wrote Warner Brothers' Lepke, starring Tony Curtis. Hoffs later wrote and produced Stony Island, with Andrew Davis, an independent film about young R&B musicians in inner city Chicago. It screened at Sundance Film Festival, Deauville American Film Festival and at the Chicago International Film Festival, where it won the coveted Lincoln Award and commendation from Illinois Governor James R. Thompson.

In 1980, Hoffs was chosen to participate in the prestigious AFI Directing Workshop for Women. Her directorial debut was the short comedy, The Haircut (Universal Studios, 1983), starring John Cassavetes, an official selection of the 1983 Cannes Film Festival, (Un Certain Regard), Toronto International Film Festival, Telluride Film Festival and Sundance Film Festival, and receiving a commendation from Robert Redford, Sundance Institute.

In 1987, Hoffs became the first woman to receive the triple director/writer/producer credit on a major studio feature film, The Allnighter (Universal Studios). In 1994, she was awarded Doctor of Humane Letters from International University College, Aix-en-Provence in International Education and European Studies.

In 1989 Hoffs wrote, produced and directed the youth musical Rock n' Read, starring Pauly Shore (MCA- Universal Studios), and Smokin': Somebody Stop Me (Library Video Company / Schlessinger Media, 1999), a series about the dangers of tobacco use. She served as producer, writer, and voice director on the digital animation series, Horrible Histories, (Scholastic Corporation, 2001), narrated by Stephen Rea.

In 2003 Hoffs wrote, directed and produced Red Roses and Petrol, a feature based on the stage play of the same name by Joseph O'Connor, starring Malcolm McDowell and Max Beesley. Her next feature, Pound of Flesh, starring Malcolm McDowell and Angus Macfadyen,  was released in 2010.

Hoffs has also directed and produced numerous music videos, notably The Bangles' "Going Down to Liverpool" and "If She Knew What She Wants" (Columbia Records, 1984). On the stage, Hoffs directed the play Ghost Music, starring Pam Grier and Nick Cassavetes (Beyond Baroque Theater, 1984).

Hoffs is a member of the Directors Guild of America, the Writers Guild of America West, and the Alliance of Women Directors. She is married to Joshua Allen Hoffs, M.D., and has three children, John, Jesse, and Susanna Hoffs of The Bangles.

Filmography
Pound of Flesh (writer, director, producer), 2009
Red Roses and Petrol (writer, director, producer), 2003
Horrible Histories (TV series) (producer), 25 episodes, 2001–2002
Rock & Read (writer, director, producer), 1989
The Allnighter (writer, director), 1987
The Bangles music video "If She Knew What She Wants" (producer), 1986
Stand Alone (associate producer), 1985
The Bangles music video "Going Down to Liverpool" (director), 1984
The Haircut (writer, director), 1982
Stony Island (writer, producer), 1978
At Home with Shields and Yarnell (associate producer), 1978
Lepke (writer), 1975

References

External links

Official "Red Roses and Petrol" Webpage

Variety: Hoffs wins Prix Tournage, Avignon Film Festival

1934 births
Film producers from Pennsylvania
American music video directors
Screenwriters from Illinois
American theatre directors
Women theatre directors
American women film directors
American voice directors
Illinois Institute of Technology alumni
Living people
Writers from Chicago
People from Johnstown, Pennsylvania
University of Chicago alumni
American women screenwriters
Yale University alumni
Film directors from Pennsylvania
Female music video directors
Screenwriters from Pennsylvania
American women film producers
Film producers from Illinois
20th-century American Jews
21st-century American Jews
20th-century American women
21st-century American women